The 1973–74 Magyar Kupa (English: Hungarian Cup) was the 34th season of Hungary's annual knock-out cup football competition.

Final

See also
 1973–74 Nemzeti Bajnokság I

References

External links
 Official site 
 soccerway.com

1973–74 in Hungarian football
1973–74 domestic association football cups
1973-74